M. Geethanandan is an Indian social activist working on political and economic issues faced by tribals and dalits in the state of Kerala, India. He co-founded the Adivasi Gothra Mahasabha along with C.K. Janu and others. He has been involved in organising several protests and struggles of Adivasis (tribes) and Dalits, notably the Muthanga agitation, an incident of police firing on the Adivasis in the Muthanga village of Wayanad district, Kerala.

Biography
Geethanandan was born in Thayyil, Kannur district, Kerala, in 1954 in a Dalit family. After obtaining Master of Science degree in Marine Sciences, he worked at the accountant-general's office in the state capital Thiruvananthapuram for about 20 years.

Kudilketti struggle
In 2001, C.K. Janu and Geethanandan led a protest of Adivasis from all over Kerala in Thiruvananthapuram. The protesters erected kudil (shacks) in front of the secretariat and demanded land rights. The protest came to be called as the Kudilketti struggle.  The Adivasi Gothra Mahasabha was born during this struggle.

Muthanga incident 

On February 19, 2003,  C.K. Janu and Geethanandan also led the occupation of land at Muthanga. The occupation ended with massive police violence in which a policeman and an Adivasi person were killed. It came to be known as the Muthanga incident and Janu had to undergo imprisonment and face 75 cases filed against her.

The tribal people had gathered under Adivasi Gothra Maha Sabha (AGMS) to protest the Kerala government's delay in allotting them land, which had been granted in October 2001. During the protest, Kerala police fired 18 rounds resulting in two immediate fatalities (one of which was a police officer). In a subsequent statement, the government placed the official death toll at five. A video of the firing was aired on several television news programs and prompted noted author, Arundhati Roy, into writing You have blood on your hands.

On 21 February 2003, AGMS leaders C. K. Janu and Geethanandan were arrested. The two were spotted by locals at a roadside, near Nambikolli, about 4 kilometers from the town of Sulthan Bathery on the Bathery-Ootty road. K. K. Surendran, a lecturer in DIET, was also arrested in connection with the tribal agitation in the sanctuary.

Villuvandi protests
Along with leaders of other Adivasi and Dalit organisations, Geethanandan protested that demanded the reinstatement of the rights of the Malayaraya Adivasi community over the land and temple in
Sabarimala. The protests used Villuvandis (carts), borrowing from the protest led by Ayyankali in 1893 demanding the right to use public roads.

Dalit hartal
On 9 April 2018, various Dalit and Adivasi organisations organised a dawn-to-dusk strike against the perceived dilution of the Scheduled Caste and Scheduled Tribe (Prevention of Atrocities) Act, 1989 by the Indian supreme court. Geethanandan co-organized the hartal and was arrested by the State police.

References

Further reading

External links
 Profile on Tehelka
 from Justice Documentary

Living people
Activists from Kerala
1954 births
Indian human rights activists
Adivasi activists
Indian women activists
Social workers from Kerala